Pipilotti Elisabeth Rist (born 21 June 1962) is a Swiss visual artist best known for creating experimental video art and installation art. Her work is often described as surreal, intimate, abstract art, having a preoccupation with the female body. Her artwork is often categorized as feminist art.

Rist's work is known for its multi-sensory qualities, with overlapping projected imagery that is highly saturated with color, paired with sound components that are part of a larger environment with spaces for viewers to rest or lounge. Rist's work often transforms the architecture or environment of a white cube gallery into a more tactile, auditory and visual experience.

Personal life
Pipilotti Rist was born Elisabeth Charlotte Rist in Grabs in the Rhine Valley. Her father is a doctor and her mother is a teacher. She started going by "Pipilotti", a combination her childhood nickname "Lotti" with her childhood hero, Astrid Lindgren’s character Pippi Longstocking, in 1982.  Prior to studying art and film, Rist studied theoretical physics in Vienna for one semester. From 1982 to 1986 Rist studied commercial art, illustration, and photography at the University of Applied Arts Vienna in Vienna. She later studied video at the Basel School of Design, Switzerland. From 1988 through 1994, she was member of the music band and performance group Les Reines prochaines. In 1997, her work was first featured in the Venice Biennial, where she was awarded the Premio 2000 Prize. From 2002 to 2003, she was invited by Professor Paul McCarthy to teach at UCLA as a visiting faculty member. From summer 2012 through to summer 2013, Rist spent a sabbatical in Somerset.

Rist lives  and works in Zurich, Switzerland with her partner Balz Roth, an entrepreneur. She and Roth have a son, Himalaya.

Career 
During her studies, Pipilotti Rist began making super 8 films. Her works generally last only a few minutes, borrowing from mass-media formats such as MTV and advertising, with alterations in their colors, speed, and sound. Her works generally treat issues related to gender, sexuality, and the human body.

Her colorful and musical works transmit a sense of happiness and simplicity. Rist's work is regarded as feminist by some art critics. Her works are held by many important art collections worldwide.

In I'm Not The Girl Who Misses Much (1986) Rist dances before a camera in a black dress with uncovered breasts. The images are often monochromatic and fuzzy. Rists repeatedly sings "I'm not the girl who misses much," a reference to the first line of the song "Happiness Is a Warm Gun" by the Beatles. As the video approaches its end, the image becomes increasingly blue and fuzzy and the sound stops.

Rist achieved notoriety with Pickelporno (Pimple porno) (1992), a work about the female body and sexual excitation. The fisheye camera moves over the bodies of a couple. The images are charged by intense colors, and are simultaneously strange, sensual, and ambiguous.

Sip my Ocean (1996) is an audio-video installation projected as a mirrored reflection on two adjoining walls, duplicating the video as sort of Rorschach inkblots. Besides a television and tea-cups other domestic items can be seen sinking slowly under the ocean surface. The video is intercut with dreamlike frames of bodies swimming underwater and other melancholic images such as colourful overlays of roses across the heavens. Slightly abstract and layered the visuals invite the viewer to reveal its depth beneath the surface. Accompanying the video is Rist singing Chris Isaak's "Wicked Game". Her voice is starting of sweetly but becomes gradually out of synchronicity with the song, ending in the shrieking chorus of “No, I don’t wanna fall in love”. Rist breaks the illusion of synchronicity in the video with the asynchrony of the audio and captures the human longing for and impossibility of being totally in tune with somebody else.

Ever is Over All (1997) shows in slow-motion a young woman walking along a city street, smashing the windows of parked cars with a large hammer in the shape of a tropical flower. At one point a police officer greets her. The audio video installation has been purchased by the Museum of Modern Art in New York City.

Rist's nine video segments titled Open My Glade were played once every hour on a screen at Times Square in New York City, a project of the Messages to the Public program, which was founded in 1980.

“I want to see how you see – a portrait of Cornelia Providori” (2003) is an audio-visual work spanning 5:16. The sound was created in collaboration with Andreas Guggisberg, with whom Rist often works with.  The main subject is the dialectical tension between macro and micro and how the continents are mirrored on the human body. The technical components are two to four layers of edited images, intricately cut and stacked on top of each other.

Pour Your Body Out was a commissioned multimedia installation organized by Klaus Biesenbach and installed in the atrium of the Museum of Modern Art in early 2009. In an interview with Phong Bui published in The Brooklyn Rail, Rist said she chose the atrium for the installation "because it reminds me of a church's interior where you’re constantly reminded that the spirit is good and the body is bad. This spirit goes up in space but the body remains on the ground. This piece is really about bringing those two differences together."

Her first feature film, Pepperminta, had its world premiere at the 66th Venice International Film Festival in 2009. She summarized the plot as "a young woman and her friends on a quest to find the right color combinations and with these colors they can free other people from fear and make life better.”

In a 2011 Guardian exhibition review article, Rist describes her feminism: "Politically," she says, "I am a feminist, but personally, I am not. For me, the image of a woman in my art does not stand just for women: she stands for all humans. I hope a young guy can take just as much from my art as any woman."

She likened her videos to that of women's handbags, hoping that it'd have “room in them for everything: painting, technology, language, music, lousy flowing pictures, poetry, commotion, premonitions of death, sex, and friendliness."

Rist's work is held in the permanent collections of museums and galleries including the Museum of Modern Art, the Solomon R. Guggenheim Museum, the San Francisco MoMA, and the Utrecht Centraal Museum.

Exhibitions 
'Big Heartedness, Be My Neighbor', The Geffen Contemporary at MOCA, Los Angeles, California - September 12, 2021 – June 6, 2022 
'Robes politiques – Women Power Fashion', Textilmuseum St. Gallen, St. Gallen, Switzerland - March 19, 2021 – February 6, 2022
'Your Eye is My Island', National Museum of Modern Art, Kyoto, Japan - Aprll 6 to June 16, 2021
'Open My Glade (Flatten)', Contemporary Art in the Public Sphere, Zurich, Switzerland - March 1 – September 22, 2019
'Sip My Ocean', The Museum of Contemporary Art Australia, Sydney, Australia, November 1, 2017 – February 18, 2018
'Open My Glade (Flatten)', Times Square Arts Midnight Moment, New York, New York - January 2017
'Pixel Forest', The New Museum, New York, New York - October 26, 2016 - January 15, 2017
'Worry Will Vanish', The Museum of Fine Arts, Houston, Texas - June 11, 2017 - September 17, 2017
‘Behind Your Eyelid’, Tai Kwun, Hong Kong SAR - August 3, 2022- November 27, 2022
'Your Brain to Me, My Brain to You, National Museum of Qatar, 21 March 2022 – 15 July 2023

Influence 
Ever is Over All was referenced in 2016 by Beyoncé in the film accompanying her album Lemonade in which the singer is seen walking down a city street smashing windows of parked cars with a baseball bat.

Recognition
 1997 – Renta Preis of the Kunsthalle Nürnberg
 1998 – Nomination for the Hugo Boss Prize
 1999 – Wolfgang Hahn Prize
 2003 – Honorary Professorship from Berlin University of the Arts
 2006 – Guggenheim Museums Young Collector's Council Annual Artist's Ball honouring Pipilotti Rist
 2007 – St. Galler Kulturpreis der St. Gallischen Kulturstiftung
 2009 – Special Award, Seville European Film Festival
 2009 – Joan Miró Prize, Barcelona
 2009 – Best Exhibition Of Digital, Video, or Film: "Pour Your Body Out (7354 Cubic Meters)" at Museum of Modern Art, New York. 26th annual awards, The International Association of Art Critics (AICA)
 2010 – Cutting the Edge Award, Miami International Film Festival
 2011 – Best Architects '11 Award
 2012 – Bazaar Art, International Artist of the Year, Hong Kong, China
 2013 – Zurich Festival Prize, Zürcher Festpiele
 2014 – Baukoma Awards for Marketing and Architecture, Best Site Development
 2021 – Elected Honorary Royal Academician (HonRA) on 9 September 2021

References

Further reading 
Phelan, Peggy, Hans Ulrich Obrist, and Elisabeth Bronfen. Pipilotti Rist. London, New York: Phaidon, 2001. 

Ravenal, John B. Outer & Inner Space: Pipilotti Rist, Shirin Neshat, Jane & Louise Wilson, and the History of Video Art. Richmond, VA: Virginia Museum of Fine Arts, 2002.  

Söll, Änne. Pipilotti Rist. Cologne: DuMont, 2005.

External links 
 
 

Swiss contemporary artists
Swiss video artists
1962 births
Living people
Swiss women artists
People from St. Gallen (city)
University of Applied Arts Vienna alumni
20th-century Swiss artists
21st-century Swiss artists
Swiss installation artists
Public art